Legal high may refer to:

 An alternative name, often a misnomer, for a designer drug
 Legal High (novel), a 2016 novel by German author Rainer Schmidt
 "Legal High", a song on the album Alive & Amplified by The Mooney Suzuki
 Legal High (Japanese TV series), a 2012 Japanese television series
 Legal High (South Korean TV series), a 2019 South Korean television series